The Monteith Correctional Complex is a medium/maximum security prison located in Monteith, a community in Iroquois Falls, Ontario.

During World War II, Monteith Correctional Complex detained captured German soldiers, and was known as POW Camp 23.

See also
 List of correctional facilities in Ontario

References

1938 establishments in Ontario
Buildings and structures in Cochrane District
Prisons in Ontario
World War II prisoner-of-war camps in Canada